Dannine Avara (née Duncan, born 1964), is a billionaire heir to the Duncan family, through Enterprise Products, an energy pipeline giant which remains under family control.

Early life
Dannine Avara was born in 1964 to Barbara and Dan Duncan. Barbara was Dan's first wife. Her father, Dan Duncan, was the co-founder of Enterprise Products.

Career
Avara is an investor. She inherited $3.1 billion upon the death of her father. Due to a temporary repeal of the estate tax law for the year 2010, Duncan became, along with her brother Scott, the first American billionaire to pay no estate tax since its enactment.

Personal life
Avara is married and lives in Houston. Avara's net worth is estimated to be $6.2 billion as of 2019.

References

Businesspeople from Houston
American billionaires
American businesspeople in the oil industry
American philanthropists
Female billionaires
Living people
Duncan family
1964 births